Charles Kidd II (born September 25, 1987), known professionally as Calmatic, is an American filmmaker from Los Angeles known for music videos and commercials. He gained widespread fame in 2019 for directing the video for "Old Town Road" by Lil Nas X featuring Billy Ray Cyrus, which won the 2019 MTV Video Music Award for Best Direction and the 2020 Grammy Award for Best Music Video. He has also worked with Kendrick Lamar, Childish Gambino, Anderson .Paak, Pharrell Williams, and Jay-Z, among others. A frequent collaborator with Vince Staples, he directed the video to Staples' single "Fun!" as well as The Vince Staples Show on YouTube. Calmatic was born and raised in South Central Los Angeles, and is known for incorporating elements of Los Angeles into each video, as well as cartoonish humor and moments of comic relief. He has cited both Spike Lee and Spike Jonze as inspirations.

Calmatic is also a noted commercial director, making ads for Target, Sprite, and other brands. His "All People Are Tax People" commercial for TurboTax premiered at the 2020 Super Bowl, and he received the Ad Age Director of the Year award the same year. In 2019 he was tapped to direct the remake of the 1990 film House Party being developed by LeBron James, which would be his feature length debut. The film would later receive very negative reviews. In 2021, Calmatic was set to direct a reboot of the 1992 sports comedy film White Men Can't Jump for 20th Century Studios.

References

External links

Calmatic at the Internet Music Video Database

1987 births
Living people
African-American film directors
American music video directors
Film directors from Los Angeles
Grammy Award winners
People from South Los Angeles
Television commercial directors